Makkasan is the name of an intersection and the surrounding neighbourhood in Bangkok's Ratchathewi district. It is one of the 180 sub-districts in Bangkok. Makkasan Intersection is divided into two closely located intersections. One is the meeting point of Ratchaprarop Road,  Chaturathit Road, Si Ayutthaya Road, and Soi Ratchaprarop 10 or Soi Mo Leng, and is known variously as Makkasan, Mo Leng or Ratchaprarop Intersection. The other is the intersection of Ratchaprarop Road and Nikhom Makkasan Road, named Nikhom Makkasan intersection. The area is considered one of the most prone to traffic jams in Bangkok, especially during rush hour. Makkasan is not far from major shopping districts and Bangkok's traffic centers, such as Pratunam or Victory Monument.

Naming and history 
The name of the intersection refers to the Makkasan people, who historically lived in the area. The Makkasan people are Muslims that migrated from Sulawesi, Indonesia to Siam in the Ayutthaya period towards the end of King Narai's reign, with the name "Makkasan" coming from the city of Makassar, now the provincial capital of South Sulawesi. The Makkasan were known by the Siamese of the time as Khaek Makkasan (แขกมักกะสัน); the Thai word khaek literally means guest and generally refers to non-Western foreigners (the term farang is used for Westerners), mostly Muslims, Hindus or Indians from the Middle East and the Malay Peninsula. 

The records of Claude de Forbin, a French naval admiral who lived in Ayutthaya at the time, states that the Makkasan rebelled on July 14th, 1686 and were suppressed with harsh measures by the Ayutthaya rulers with the aid of foreign aristocrats such as Constantine Phaulkon. The incident was called "Makkasan Rebellion" (กบฏมักกะสัน, ขบถมักกะสัน). The appearance of the Makkasan was compared to Yakshas by the Siamese, giving rise to the Thai term yak makkasan (ยักษ์มักกะสัน), meaning a cruel person.

When King Phutthayotfa Chulalok (Rama I) established the Rattanakosin Kingdom in today's Bangkok in 1782, he allowed Makkasan people from Ayutthaya to settle in this area, leading to the area being named after them. Many places in the area also bear the name, such as Makkasan Station, the biggest rapid transit station on the Airport Rail Link, Makkasan railway station, a class 1 railway station which also includes a depot of the same name, Bueng Makkasan, a large artificial lake in the center of Bangkok built in 1931 by the State Railway of Thailand (SRT), and the Makkasan Interchange, a part of the Chaloem Maha Nakhon Expressway and the Sirat Expressway.

Places
Tourism Authority of Thailand (TAT)
Bangkok Doll Museum
Soi Ratchataphan (also known as Soi Mo Leng)

References 

Neighbourhoods of Bangkok
Ratchathewi district
Road junctions in Bangkok
Subdistricts of Bangkok